Purameri  is a Village Panchayat in Kozhikode district of North Malabar region in the Indian state of Kerala. It is located in the north-western part of the district, on the way from Vatakara to Nadapuram.

Demographics
 India census, Purameri had a population of 25,405. Males constitute 47.4% of the population and females 52.6%. Purameri has an average literacy rate of 83%, higher than the national average of 59.5%: female literacy is 81%, and male literacy is 85%.

Geography
Purameri is located in Vatakara Taluk of Kozhikode district. It shares borders with Nadapuram to the east, Edacheri to the west, Thuneri to the south and Mayyazhipuzha to the north.

History & Culture
History of Purameri is known from the period of Ballads of North Malabar.  In many ślokas of this ballad, Purameri has been mentioned.  In the mediaeval's period, Purameri was administered by Naduvazhikal.  During British Raj, this place was under Malabar district.  The Kadathanadan culture is still alive here.  Theyyams and Thiras are held during temple festivals.  Major religions are Hinduism and Islams.  People from both religions, take part in festivals of either group.

Transportation
Purameri village connects to other parts of India through Vatakara city on the west and Kuttiady town on the east.  National highway No.66 passes through Vatakara and the northern stretch connects to Mangalore, Goa and Mumbai.  The southern stretch connects to Cochin and Trivandrum.  The eastern Highway  going through Kuttiady connects to Mananthavady, Mysore and Bangalore. The nearest airports are at Kannur and Kozhikode.  The nearest railway station is at Vatakara.

References

Villages in Kozhikode district
Vatakara area